Johnathan Loyd (born August 15, 1991) is an American professional basketball player for the Island Storm of the National Basketball League of Canada (NBL Canada). He was a dual sport college athlete playing guard and wide receiver for the University of Oregon basketball and football teams, respectively.

High school and College
Loyd played high school basketball and football at Bishop Gorman in Las Vegas, Nevada.

Loyd is the winningest player in the history of the University of Oregon Men's Basketball program with 97 career wins over 4 seasons. In 2013, the Ducks made a Sweet Sixteen appearance in the NCAA Tournament, their best showing in the tournament since the 2007 season.

Professional career
After going undrafted in the 2014 NBA draft, Loyd 
In the summer of 2015 Loyd participated in the Four Nations international basketball tournament in China as a member of the Netscouts USA Men's All-Star basketball team.

2018 season

Johnathan Loyd signed with the Nevada Desert Dogs of the North American Premier Basketball League (NAPB).

2019 season
On February 28, 2019, Johnathan Loyd signed with the Island Storm of the National Basketball League of Canada (NBL Canada).

As of June 2021 Jonathan plays for the Kokomo (Indiana) BobKats in The Basketball League.

References

External links
 Oregon Ducks basketball bio
 Oregon Ducks football bio

1991 births
Living people
American men's basketball players
Basketball players from Nevada
Bishop Gorman High School alumni
Island Storm players
Oregon Ducks football players
Oregon Ducks men's basketball players
Players of American football from Nevada
Point guards
Sportspeople from Las Vegas